Jimmy O'Neill may refer to:
 Jimmy O'Neill (footballer, born 1931) (1931–2007), Irish international football goalkeeper who played for Everton, Stoke City, Darlington and Port Vale
 Jimmy O'Neill (footballer, born 1941), Northern Irish footballer who played for Sunderland and Northern Ireland
 Jimmy O'Neill (DJ) (1940–2013), American DJ; hosted Shindig!
 Jimmy O'Neal (American contemporary artist, born 1967)

See also
Jimmie O'Neill
James O'Neill (disambiguation)
James O'Neil (disambiguation)
James O'Neal (disambiguation)
 Jim O'Neill (disambiguation)
 James Neal (disambiguation)